Carmenta phoradendri, the mistletoe borer, is a moth of the family Sesiidae. It was described by George Paul Engelhardt in 1946. It is known from south-eastern Arizona and southern Texas in the United States and from Mexico.

Adults are on wing in August and September.

Larvae feed on Phoradendron tomentosum growing on mesquite (Prosopis glandulosa).

References

External links
mothphotographersgroup

Sesiidae
Moths described in 1946